Paraboloidal coordinates are three-dimensional orthogonal coordinates  that generalize two-dimensional parabolic coordinates. They possess elliptic paraboloids as one-coordinate surfaces. As such, they should be distinguished from parabolic cylindrical coordinates and parabolic rotational coordinates, both of which are also generalizations of two-dimensional parabolic coordinates. The coordinate surfaces of the former are parabolic cylinders, and the coordinate surfaces of the latter are circular paraboloids.

Differently from cylindrical and rotational parabolic coordinates, but similarly to the related ellipsoidal coordinates, the coordinate surfaces of the paraboloidal coordinate system are not produced by rotating or projecting any two-dimensional orthogonal coordinate system.

Basic formulas

The Cartesian coordinates  can be produced from the ellipsoidal coordinates 
 by the equations

with

Consequently, surfaces of constant  are downward opening elliptic paraboloids:

Similarly, surfaces of constant  are upward opening elliptic paraboloids,

whereas surfaces of constant  are hyperbolic paraboloids:

Scale factors

The scale factors for the paraboloidal coordinates  are

Hence, the infinitesimal volume element is

Differential operators 

Common differential operators can be expressed in the coordinates  by substituting the scale factors into the general formulas for these operators, which are applicable to any three-dimensional orthogonal coordinates. For instance, the gradient operator is

and the Laplacian is

Applications 

Paraboloidal coordinates can be useful for solving certain partial differential equations. For instance, the Laplace equation and Helmholtz equation are both separable in paraboloidal coordinates. Hence, the coordinates can be used to solve these equations in geometries with paraboloidal symmetry, i.e. with boundary conditions specified on sections of paraboloids.

Taking , the separated equations are

Similarly, the separated equations for the Laplace equation can be obtained by setting  in the above.

Each of the separated equations can be cast in the form of the Baer equation. Direct solution of the equations is difficult, however, in part because the separation constants  and  appear simultaneously in all three equations. 

Following the above approach, paraboloidal coordinates have been used to solve for the electric field surrounding a conducting paraboloid.

References

Bibliography

  Same as Morse & Feshbach (1953), substituting uk for ξk.

External links
MathWorld description of confocal paraboloidal coordinates

Three-dimensional coordinate systems
Orthogonal coordinate systems